Coloniensis is a Latin adjective meaning "of Cologne". It occurs in many names:

Adam Teuto, called Coloniensis
Albertus Coloniensis
Annales sancti Panthaleonis Coloniensis maximi
Archidioecesis Coloniensis
Argentodites coloniensis
Cappella Coloniensis
Chronica regia Coloniensis
Codex Manichaicus Coloniensis
Wolbero Coloniensis